Camp Ground may refer to:
Campsite, a dedicated area for overnight camping
Camp Ground, Illinois, an unincorporated community
Camp Ground Methodist Church, a historic church in North Carolina